Kawachi ( or ) may refer to:

Places
 Kawachi Province, one of the old provinces of Japan
 Kawachi, Kumamoto, a former town in Kumamoto Prefecture
 Kawachi, Osaka, a former city in Osaka Prefecture 
 Kawachi, Ibaraki, a town in Ibaraki Prefecture
 Kawachi, Ishikawa, a former village in Ishikawa Prefecture
 Kawachi, Tochigi, a former town in Tochigi Prefecture

Other uses
 Kawachi ondo, a genre of Japanese music
 , a two-ship class of dreadnought battleships built for the Imperial Japanese Navy
 , lead ship of her class battleship during World War I
 Kawachi Bankan, a pomelo-like citrus hybrid

People with the surname

, Japanese footballer
,  Japanese boxer
, Japanese actor

Fictional characters:
, a character in Yakitate!! Japan

See also
 Cahuachi, major ceremonial center of the Nazca culture in present-day Peru
 Kawauchi (disambiguation)
 Kochi (disambiguation)
 河内 (disambiguation)